This is a list of the compositions of the Italian virtuoso violinist Niccolò Paganini (1782–1840).

With MS number

Without MS number

Violin solo
Quattro Studi per violino solo (orig. name Studj No.4) Quattro studi per violino solo - Società Editrice di Musicologia : 
No.1 in C major [Allegretto]
No.2 in A major (Moderato)
No.3 in C major (Moderato assai)
No.4 in G major (Sostenuto)

Guitar solo
5 pieces for Guitar (1800)
12 pieces for Guitar without number:
a1) Minuetto (E)
a2) Rondo Allegro (E)
b) Andantino (C) ??(MS.89 or 97)
c) Allegretto (A) ??(MS.86 or 90)
d1) Allegretto (A) ??(MS.86 or 90)
d2) Minuetto (a)
e1) Valtz (C) ??(MS.92 or 100)
e2) Valtz (C) ??(MS.92 or 100)
e3) Rondocino(C)
f1) Valtz (E) ??(MS.96)
f2) Andantino (C) ??(MS.89 or 97)
5 pieces for Guitar (First edition : Milan, Ricordi, 1975):
Scherzo (C)
Sonatine (C)
Rondo (C)
Allegretto (E)
Menuet (E)

Chamber music
"6 Duettini" for violin and guitar
"Variazioni di bravura" (on Caprice No.24) for violin and guitar
"6 Duetti Fiorentini" for violin and piano (Ed. Max Kergl)
"Sonata a violino principale" (for solo violin, violin and cello)
"Introduzione e tema con variazioni" (for solo violin and string quartet)
"6 Preludi" (for 2 violins and bass)
"4 Studies" for solo violin
"6 Preludes" for solo violin

Vocal
"Vocal Fantasy" (aria for soprano and orchestra)
La Farfalletta (for voice and piano)

Doubtful works
"Divertimenti concertanti" for violin and piano (?MS.viN4)
"" (3 Varied Airs to be executed on the fourth string alone for violin with piano accompaniment)(G. Carulli) (?MS.vN3)
"Les charmes de Padoue" (Padua attractions) for violin and piano (First public exhibition: London, 1831) (?MS.vN5)
"Tema Napolitana" (Padua attractions) for violin and piano(part lost) (?MS.vN11)

Lost
Capriccio on "Là ci darem la mano" (1828) for violin and orchestra (from Mozart's Don Giovanni, perf. Vienna, 11 May 1828)
"Fandango Spagnolo" (1800) for violin

References

 
Paganini